Delicious Miss Brown is an American cooking television series that airs on Food Network. The series is presented by chef Kardea Brown; and it features Brown showcasing how to cook her Southern-inspired recipes from her home in Charleston, South Carolina.

Delicious Miss Brown premiered on July 28, 2019.

On August 3, 2020, it was announced that the third season will premiere on September 6, 2020.

Episodes

Season 1 (2019)

Season 2 (2020)

Season 3

References

External links

 FRANK.

2010s American cooking television series
2019 American television series debuts
English-language television shows
Food Network original programming
Food reality television series
Television shows filmed in South Carolina
Television shows set in Charleston, South Carolina